The Jiajing Railway (shortened form of Jiayuguan–Jingtieshan Railway), officially the Jingtieshan Branch Line, is a -long branch line of the Lanxin Railway in Gansu Province, China.  The railway line mostly runs through rural Sunan County and connects Jiayuguan City with the Jingtieshan iron mine in the Qilian Mountains south of Jiayuguan.  The route follows the course of the Beida River through the Qilian Mountains before reaching the Gobi Desert outside of Jiayuguan.

Construction on the Jiajing Railway began in 1958 and was completed in 1965. Construction of the line involved multiple tunnels and bridges to navigate through the mountains, and the line crosses the Beida a total of 8 times. In addition to the transport of goods, the railway serves as a passenger line primarily for mine workers from Jiayuguan.

Stations

References

Railway lines in China
Rail transport in Gansu